Truth and Justice is a 1916 British silent drama film directed by Bert Haldane and starring Florence Alliston, Horatio Bottomley and Will Page.

Cast
 Florence Alliston 
 Horatio Bottomley as himself 
 Will Page as The Husband

References

Bibliography
 Low, Rachael. The History of British Film, Volume III: 1914-1918. Routledge, 1997.

External links

1916 films
1916 drama films
British silent short films
British drama films
1910s English-language films
Films directed by Bert Haldane
British black-and-white films
1910s British films
Silent drama films